The Seoul Design Foundation was initially proposed on November 20, 2008 by the Seoul Metropolitan Government in order to promote design industry.  It launched on March 2, 2009 and is run by direct endowment from the Seoul City. It consists of a group of design experts.

History 
In 2015, the Seoul Design Foundation has implemented various projects promoting Seoul’s design industry and spread design culture with its monumental multipurpose complex Dongdaemun Design Plaza (DDP). DDP aims to become the hub of global design. 

The initiative aims to strengthen Seoul’s design capacity by unfolding various projects  to promote Seoul’s design industry and spread design culture based on its flagship facilities, the Dongdaemun Design Plaza & Park.

It is located at: 3F,9F, Yeonho Bldg., 21-1, Seosomun-dong, Jung-gu, Seoul.

Activities 

 Seoul Design Week
 Human City Design Award
 DDP (Dongdaemun Design Plaza)
 Seoul Fashion Week

References

External links

 

Organizations based in Seoul